The Chinese giant salamander (Andrias davidianus) is one of the largest salamanders and one of the largest amphibians in the world. It is fully aquatic, and is endemic to rocky mountain streams and lakes in the Yangtze river basin of central China. Either it or a close relative has been introduced to Kyoto Prefecture in Japan and to Taiwan. It is considered critically endangered in the wild due to habitat loss, pollution, and overcollection, as it is considered a delicacy and used in traditional Chinese medicine. On farms in central China, it is extensively farmed and sometimes bred, although many of the salamanders on the farms are caught in the wild. It has been listed as one of the top-10 "focal species" in 2008 by the Evolutionarily Distinct and Globally Endangered project.

The Chinese giant salamander is considered to be a "living fossil". Although protected under Chinese law and CITES Appendix I, the wild population has declined by more than an estimated 80% since the 1950s. Although traditionally recognized as one of two living species of Andrias salamander in Asia, the other being the Japanese giant salamander, evidence indicates that the Chinese giant salamander may be composed of at least five cryptic species, further compounding each individual species' endangerment.

Taxonomy 
The correct scientific name of this species has been argued to be Andrias scheuchzeri (in which case Andrias davidianus would be a junior synonym) – a name otherwise restricted to an extinct species described from Swiss fossils. It has also been given the moniker of "living fossil" for being part of the family Cryptobranchidae which dates back 170 million years. It is one of only five to six known extant species of the family, the others being the slightly smaller, but otherwise very similar Japanese giant salamander (Andrias japonicus), the slightly larger South China giant salamander (A. sligoi), the Jiangxi giant salamander (Andrias jiangxiensis), an undescribed Andrias species from eastern China, and the far smaller North American hellbender (Cryptobranchus alleganiensis).

A 2018 study of mitochondrial DNA revealed that there are five wild clades of the Chinese giant salamander, as well as two only known from captives (their possible wild range was previously unknown). They diverged from each other 4.71–10.25 million years ago and should possibly be recognized as cryptic species. Despite this deep divergence, they can hybridize among each other, and also with the Japanese giant salamander. One of these clades was identified in 2019 as Andrias sligoi, a species described in 1924 by Edward George Boulenger and later synonymized with A. davidianus, with the study supporting its revival as a distinct taxon. Another as-of-yet undescribed species was also identified that formerly inhabited rivers originating from the Huangshan mountains in eastern China. In 2022, one of the captive-only clades was described as Andrias jiangxiensis, and was found to have maintained genetically pure wild populations in Jiangxi Province, in contrast to most of the other clades.

Description 
It has a large head, small eyes, and dark, wrinkly skin. Its flat, broad head has a wide mouth, round, lidless eyes, and a line of paired tubercles that run around its head and throat. Its color is typically dark brown with a mottled or speckled pattern, but it can also be other brownish tones, dark reddish, or black. Albinos, which are white or orange, have been recorded. All species of giant salamanders produce a sticky, white skin secretion that repels predators.

The giant salamander is known to vocalize, making barking, whining, hissing, or crying sounds. Some of these vocalizations bear a striking resemblance to the crying of a young human child, and as such, it is known in the Chinese language as the "infant fish" (娃娃鱼 / 鲵 - Wáwáyú/ ní).

Behavior

Feeding 
The Chinese giant salamander has been recorded feeding on insects, millipedes, horsehair worms, amphibians (both frogs and salamanders), freshwater crabs, shrimp, fish (such as Saurogobio and Cobitis) and Asiatic water shrew. Presumably ingested by mistake, plant material and gravel have also been found in their stomachs. Cannibalism is frequent; in a study of 79 specimens from the Qinling–Dabashan range, the stomach content of five included remains of other Chinese giant salamanders and this made up 28% of the combined weight of all food items in the study. The most frequent items in the same study were freshwater crabs (found in 19 specimens), which made up 23% of the combined weight of all food items.

It has very poor eyesight, so it depends on special sensory nodes that run in a line on the body from head to tail. It is capable of sensing the slightest vibrations around it with the help of these nodes. Based on a captive study, most activity is from the earlier evening to the early night.

Breeding and lifecycle 

The reproductive cycle is initiated when the water temperature reaches  and mating occurs between July and September. The female lays 400–500 eggs in an underwater breeding cavity, which is guarded by the male until the eggs hatch after 50–60 days. They have a variety of different courtship displays including knocking bellies, leaning side-to-side, riding, mouth-to-mouth posturing, chasing, rolling over, inviting, and cohabiting. When laid, the eggs measure  in diameter, but they increase to about double that size by absorbing water. The maximum age reached by Chinese giant salamanders is unknown, but it is at least 60 years based on captive individuals. Undocumented claims have been made of 200-year-old Chinese giant salamanders, but these are considered unreliable.

Distribution and habitat 
The Chinese giant salamander species complex comprises five clades, with multiple possibly worthy of species recognition. Their native ranges differ, but release of Chinese giant salamanders from captivity has complicated this picture. They were widespread in central, south-western and southern China, although their range is now highly fragmented. Their range spans the area from Qinghai east to Jiangsu and south to Sichuan, Guangxi and Guangdong; notably in the basins of the Yangtze, Yellow and Pearl Rivers. One is from the Pearl River basin (at least in Guangxi), two from the Yellow River basin, one from the Yangtze River basin (at least in Chongqing and Guizhou) and the final from the Qiantang River (at least in Anhui). Two additional clades were only known from captivity (their wild range is unknown) and no samples are available for the population in the Tibetan Plateau. A 2019 study has identified that the Yangtze River clade comprises the "true" A. davidianus, the Pearl River clade comprises A. sligoi, and the Qiantang clade comprises the undescribed Huangshan Mountains species. A 2022 study identified one of the two clades known only from captivity as A. jiangxiensis, found in the wild only in Jiangxi Province.

Finds in Taiwan may be the result of introduction. Chinese giant salamanders have been introduced to the Kyoto Prefecture in Japan where they present a threat to the native Japanese giant salamander, as the two hybridize.

The Chinese giant salamander is entirely aquatic and lives in rocky hill streams and lakes with clear water. It typically lives in dark muddy or rocky crevices along the banks.

Although they prefer to have quick flow in the stream, the burrows in which they lay their eggs often have much slower flow. Furthermore, their habitat often possesses very rocky, irregular stream beds with a lot of gravel and small rocks as well as some vegetation. Chinese giant salamanders are also known from subterranean rivers. As populations in aboveground rivers and lakes are more vulnerable to poaching, there are some parts of China where only the subterranean populations remain.

In captivity

Farming 
Very large numbers are being farmed in China, but most of the breeding stock are either wild-caught or first-generation captive-bred. This is partially explained by the fact that the industry is relatively new, but some farms have also struggled to produce second-generation captive-bred offspring. Registrations showed that 2.6 million Chinese giant salamanders were kept in farms in 2011 in Shaanxi alone, far surpassing the entire countrywide wild population estimated at less than 50,000 individuals. Shaanxi farms (mainly in the Qinling Mountain region) accounted for about 70% of the total output in China in 2012, but there are also many farms in Guizhou and several in other provinces. Among 43 south Shaanxi farms surveyed, 38 bred the species in 2010 and each produced an average of c. 10,300 larvae that year. Farming of Chinese giant salamanders, herbs and mushrooms are the three most important economic activities in Shaanxi's Qinling Mountain region, and many thousands of families rely on the giant salamander farms for income. The giant salamander farming mainly supplies the food market, but whether this can be achieved to an extent where the pressure on the wild populations is reduced is doubtful. Release of captive-bred Chinese giant salamanders is supported by the government (8,000 were released in Shaanxi in 2011 alone), but represent a potential risk to the remaining wild population, as diseases such as Ranavirus are known from many farms. The vast majority of the farmed Chinese giant salamanders, almost 80% based on a study published in 2018, are of Yellow River origin (the so-called haplotype B), although those from other regions also occur. Farms have generally not considered this issue when releasing giant salamanders and Yellow River animals now dominate in some regions outside their original range, further endangering the native types. Additionally, release of untreated wastewater from farms may spread diseases to wild Chinese giant salamanders.

In zoos and aquariums 
As of early 2008, Species360 records show only five individuals held in US zoos (Zoo Atlanta, Cincinnati Zoo, and Saint Louis Zoological Park), and an additional four in European zoos (Dresden Zoo and Rotterdam Zoo); as well as one in the State Museum of Natural History Karlsruhe, where it is also the museum's mascot.

As of 2019, London Zoo holds four individuals (one of them on display) that were seized from an illegal importation of amphibians in 2016. There are also two in residence at the Los Angeles Zoo. Additional individuals are likely kept in non-Species360 zoos and animals parks in its native China, such as Shanghai Zoo. Several of them are kept in the aquaria of Shanghai and Xian. The Osaka Aquarium Kaiyukan in Japan has both a Chinese and a Japanese giant salamander on display, as does the Saitama aquarium in Hanyū, Saitama.

Since May 2014, 33 Chinese giant salamanders, including three adults, have been held in Prague Zoo.

Decline in population 

In the past, the Chinese giant salamander was fairly common and widespread in China. Since the 1950s, the population has declined rapidly due to habitat destruction and overhunting. It has been listed as Critically Endangered in the Chinese Red Book of Amphibians and Reptiles. Despite the Chinese Government listing the salamander as a Class II Protected Species, 100 salamanders are hunted illegally every year in the Hupingshan Natural Nature Reserve alone. Since the 1980s, 14 nature reserves have been established as an effort to conserve the species. Despite this, the population continues to decline with the salamanders becoming increasingly difficult to find. In a recent survey of the species in the Qinghai Province, none were found indicating the population size is at a significantly low number or the species is locally extinct in the province. This is believed to be due to the increased mining in the region.

In recent years populations have also declined with an epizootic Ranavirus infection. The disease causes severe hemorrhaging in both juveniles and adult salamanders. The virus was named the Chinese giant salamander iridovirus (GSIV).

Its natural range has suffered in the past few decades due to habitat loss and overharvesting. Consequently, many salamanders are now farmed in mesocosms across China. Furthermore, previously built concrete dams that destroyed the salamander's habitat are now fitted with stairs so that the animal can easily navigate the dam and make it back to its niche.

The Chinese giant salamander is listed as a critically endangered species. It has experienced a drastic population decline, which is estimated to be more than 80% in the last 3 generations and due to human causes. Human consumption is the main threat to the Chinese giant salamander. They are considered to be a luxury food item and source of traditional medicines in China.

Habitat destruction 
According to a recent study, 90% of the Chinese giant salamanders' habitat was destroyed by the year 2000, and there are many human-related causes of such massive destruction. Because the salamander dwells in free-flowing streams, industrialization is a large problem for many stream-dwelling species. The construction of dams greatly disturbs their habitat by either causing these streams to dry up or to stand still, thus making it uninhabitable by the salamanders. Siltation also contributes to the degradation of their habitats by soiling the water. Deforestation in areas near the streams can worsen soil erosion and create runoff into the streams as well, which reduces the water quality to a great extent. The reduced water quality makes it much more difficult for the salamanders to absorb oxygen through their skin and can often bring death to those within the species.

Water pollution is also a great factor in the habitat destruction of the Chinese giant salamander; the immense decline in their population can be traced to, among the other major problems of over-hunting and failed conservation efforts, the tainting of the water that they live in. Mining activity in particular in areas near their streams often causes runoff that sullies the water, and farming—and all of the pesticides and chemicals that affect the soil that come with it—has a vastly negative effect on the areas near the streams as well. The presence of macronutrients in the streams can also cause algal blooms, which cloud the water and force the temperature to rise. The salamanders reside primarily in very cold underwater cavities and follow a specific nesting requirement, which means that they will only reproduce and care for their eggs in areas such as these, so changes in temperature are incredibly detrimental to their health and well-being as well as to their perpetuation as a species. These algal blooms also deplete the levels of oxygen in the water, and a lesser supply of oxygen can quite easily hold the potential to kill off many members of the dwindling species.

Many efforts have been undertaken to create reserves and faux habitats for the Chinese giant salamander so that they can reproduce without worry of soiled water, but many of these reserves have failed in having a great impact overall due to the massive overhunting of the species. No matter how many members of the species they manage to save through the reserves, the poachers still manage to capture and kill that many more. Although habitat destruction is certainly not assisting in the perpetuation of the species, it is certainly not the biggest obstacle that the Chinese giant salamander faces in its quest to avoid extinction.

Climate change 
Like other amphibians, the Chinese giant salamander is ectothermic. As a consequence, the species is vulnerable to global warming.

Overhunting 

One of the main reasons that the Chinese giant salamander, Andrias davidianus, has been placed on the critically endangered list by the International Union for Conservation of Nature is overhunting. 75% of native species in China are harvested for food. The salamander is also used for traditional medicinal purposes. In 1989, the Chinese government placed legal protection on the salamander (category II due to its population decline by The Wild Animal Protection Law of China and Appendix I in the Convention of Endangered Species of Wild Fauna.).

But the salamander populations have continued to decline. The domestic demand for salamander meat and body parts greatly exceeds what can sustainably be harvested from the wild. Commercial captive breeding operations so far still rely on the regular introduction of new wild-caught breeding adults, because captive-bred animals have proven difficult to mate. In addition, salamander farms would need to increase their yield manifold before the black-market price of poached salamander drop significantly, meaning that a stricter enforcement of anti-poaching law is still very much the future for the Chinese giant salamander.

China's penalty for illegally hunting these creatures is very low and only comes to 50 yuan, or about US$6, which is less than one hundred times the black-market price. Establishments such as restaurants can charge up to US$250–US$400 per kilogram.

A hunting tool known as a bow hook is one of the preferred methods used by hunters to catch the salamander. This hunting tool is made with a combination of bamboo and sharp hooks baited with frogs or smaller fish. This is used to capture the salamander and keep it alive. Some hunters use pesticides to kill the salamander. Farmers often poach wild salamanders to stock their breeding programs, while others are hunted as food.

In a 2018 study, the Zoological Society of London and the Kunming Institute of Zoology in China reported on their surveys for giant salamanders in 16 Chinese provinces over four years. The researchers had been unable to confirm survival of wild salamanders at any of the 97 sites they surveyed. The study also brought up worries that commercial farms and conservation programs were crossbreeding what they described as five distinct species of Chinese giant salamanders. All the wild populations studied were found "critically depleted or extirpated" by the study. A related study found that some of the five distinct genetic lineages were probably already extinct in the wild. However, the exhaustiveness of these surveys was questioned in a 2022 study by Chai et al., who noted that over a third of the surveys had been performed only in Guizhou Province, and another third of the surveys had been performed in provinces that were only selected by habitat suitability modeling and had no actual historic records of giant salamanders. Based on this, the extent of extirpation of Chinese Andrias remains uncertain, especially as a natural population of Andrias jiangxiensis was discovered during the Chai et al. study.

Conservation efforts 

To understand the conservation efforts in China, it is important to know something about the events of the several past hundred years of China's history relating to social attitudes, pressures on nature and natural resources, and the political ambition to safeguard the natural environment. Each of these are significant factors and determinants of conservation efforts. Up until the year 1700, China was a country that was rampant with land reclamations, growing land exploitation, and wars. These series of events led to a huge upsurge in the diminishing of the natural biomass and as well as a reduction in spatial distribution of biotic resources. The significance of this situation was that this drastic dwindling of resources made the people of this region aware of the relationship between utilization and conservation. From 1911 to 1949, China began to move into the direction of modern industry, urbanization, civil wars, and agriculture. This transition period brought with it the depletion and disappearance of various renewable resources, as well as the pollution of various biotopes. This lack of conservation eventually led to a deteriorating environment, which meant lower standards of living for the Chinese population. This is the point when both the government and the people of China came to the epiphany that the environment matters. It was not until 1956 that modern nature conservation efforts begin to develop.

The Chinese reforms that preceded this new Chinese perspective on conservation were not only beneficial to the Chinese giant salamander, but all organisms that occupied the natural environment of China. There was a formation of a new administrative system for nature conservation, which came together in the late 1950s. This new structure was able to establish new regulations that aimed at being successful in educating the masses about the value and significance of nature conservation, promoting awareness on the present status of various species, as well as prohibiting anti-conservation efforts such as hunting and trading of protected species such as the Chinese giant salamander. Some examples would be the Environmental Protection Law of 1979, Regulation of Water and Soil Conservation of 1982, Forestry Law of 1985, as well as the Wildlife Conservation Law of 1988. It was during this time period that the Chinese giant salamander was categorized as a category II species. All these species are endangered because their population is declining or their geographic distribution is becoming restricted.

In the midst of all these conservation efforts, in the late 1970s, a program network of nature reserves was established in China. These reserves were established to uphold four major principles.

 First, is to conserve typical ecosystems and to represent the biotic communities. 
 Second, the reserves are meant to secure rare, endemic, and valuable species, as well as their habitats or breeding locations. 
 Third, these reserves were developed to rescue and regenerate deteriorated or damaged natural ecosystems and habitats of special significance. 
 Finally, the reserves would be created in order to have sanctuaries in areas of special importance, such as seed forests, geological sections, glacial remains, watershed forest, etc.

Many of these reservations were created for the overall protection of all endangered species of China and the conservation of the natural world they occupy. A few more reservations were made specifically with the idea of preserving Chinese giant salamander populations. Beginning in the 1980s, there have been more than 14 nature reserves established for the conservation of the Chinese giant salamander, such as the Zhangjiaje Giant Salamander Nature Reserve, Lushi Giant Salamander Nature Reserve, Qingyaoshan Giant Salamander Nature Reserve, Youyang Giant Salamander Nature Reserve, and the Taibai Giant Salamander Nature Reserve.

Though many efforts have been put forward, very few regulations have actually been enforced. Due to lack of strong influential regulations and lack of funding, the conservation of the Chinese giant salamander has all but failed. They continue to have major decline in their populations due to human intervention of many different sorts. Even nature reserves continue to see diminution of populations. Many of the reserves suffer from the same issues, such as shortage of funding and personnel, poaching, development of tourism, etc. Few believe that even with the major losses already suffered, the situation can still be turned around through proper protection of the Chinese giant salamander habitats, nesting sites, prevention of pollution from surface runoff, banning of certain hunting methods, and an assessment of irrigation work with nature reserves. Some believe that there also need to be more surveys carried out that institutes the conservation status and demography of the salamander, as well as having a holistic view of the life history of this species. Others say that a public information campaign is needed to better educate local inhabitants.

Construction has begun on the largest artificial breeding and protection base for the endangered giant salamander in China. The base in Jing'an County, in the eastern province of Jiangxi, will breed the amphibians for scientific research, the traditional Chinese medicine industry and for exhibition in aquariums. Located in the Sanzhaolun Forest Park, the 10.83 million yuan (1.35 million U.S. dollars) project is intended to breed 60,000 giant salamanders annually when it is completed by the end of next year. The base, covering 10,000 square meters, would boost efforts to save the world's largest amphibian from extinction, said Li Xinfa, head of the Jing'an County Giant Salamander Research Center. The number of wild giant salamanders has declined rapidly due to their value as a source of traditional Chinese medicine ingredients and as food, and due to poaching, loss of habitat and pollution. It is included in Appendix I of the Convention on International Trade in Endangered Species meaning commercial international trade in wild specimens is prohibited, and it is under state protection in China. EDGE (Evolutionarily Distinct & Globally Endangered) aims to ensure the future of this salamander by helping to create an environmental education programme encouraging sustainable management of wild populations.

See also

References 

Cryptobranchidae
Amphibians of China
Amphibians described in 1871
Traditional Chinese medicine
Taxa named by Émile Blanchard
Critically endangered fauna of Asia
Species endangered by human consumption for medicinal or magical purposes
Species endangered by use as food
Species endangered by habitat loss
Endemic fauna of China
Critically endangered fauna of China